Walauwa or walawwa is the name given to a feudal/colonial manor house in Sri Lanka of a native headmen. It also refers to the feudal social systems that existed during the colonial era.

The term walauwa is derived from the Tamil word valavu, which denotes a compound or garden, and by implication, a large house with aristocratic connotations. The pinnacle of walauwas in the Sinhala social stratum is the wasala walauwa.  Wasala is derived from the Tamil vaasal, which means an entrance. In the Sinhalese social hierarchy, a wasala walawa would typically be the ancestral residence of a mudaliyar.

Walauwas vary in style, elegance and uniqueness depending upon the financial resources of the individual families and in the village or area's social structure. Most walauwas tend to incorporate aspects of traditional pre-colonial Ceylonese architecture, as well as Dutch and later colonial influences. A walauwa usually consisted of a cluster of buildings linked by verandahs, with an internal courtyard (medamidula), which separated the private life of the family from the headman's public duties.

The walauwa were traditionally associated with the homes of the courtiers (radala), members of the royal court in Kandy. It was displaced by their colonial equivalents following the dissolution of the Kingdom of Kandy by the British.

Kandyan Walauwas
There were 19 main walauwas in the Kandyan Kingdom of Ceylon. These were (in alphabetical order):
 Arapola Walauwa (demolished)
 Dehigama Walauwa (demolished - Central Finance Building)
 Dullewe Walauwa (part of Queen's Hotel)
 Dunuwila Walauwa (currently Kandy Town Hall)
 Ehelepola Walauwa (fmr Bogambara Remand Centre)
 Allepola Walauwa 
 Eravwawala Walauwa
 Galpotthawela Walauwa
 Kapuwatte Walauwa
 Mampitiya Walauwa (Royal Bar and Hotel)
 Meegasthenna Walauwa
 Moladanda Walauwa 
 Madugalle Walauwa (demolished)
 Molligoda Walauwa (demolished)
 Nugawela Walauwa (The Manor House)
 Pilamathalawa Walauwa (President's House)
 Ratwatte Walauwa (Chandra Silk House)

Other Prominent Walauwas in Kandyan Kingdom

 Angunawela Walauwa, Peradeniya
 Deldeniya Walauwa, Yatinuwara
 Elapatha Walauwa, Rathnapura
 Maduwanwela Walawwa, Kolonne
 Mahawelatenne Walauwa, Balangoda
Welivita waththe walauwa,Tumpane
Meeduma Walauwa, Rambukkana
Paranagama walauwa, Paranagama, wettewa , Galagedara
Ranwala Walauwa, Niyangoda
Elapatha Walauwa, Rathnapura
Amunugama Walauwa,Kobbekaduwa
Thambagamuwa Walauwa, Ata Kalan Koralaya, Ratnapura

Sathara Korale Walauwas (Kegalle District) 
The Sathara Korale of Ceylon had 30 main walauwas, according to the Sathara Korale Viththi Grantha. They are listed alphabetically after each other. 

 Aludeniya Walauwa
 Aluth Nuwara Walauwa
 Araupala Walauwa
 Asmadala Walauwa 
 Arrachchi Walauwa
 Athurupana Walauwa
 Baminiwaththa Walauwa
 Dodamthale Walauwa
 Edanduwawa Walauwa
 Mapitigama Mahawaththa Walauwa, Meedeniya, Kegalle
 Halagiriya Walauwa
 Handagama Walauwa
 Harigala Walauwa
 Kadigamuwa Walauwa
 Kappagoda Walauwa
 Kempitiya Walauwa
 Keppetipola Walauwa
 Kotagama Walauwa
 Kumbal Oluwa Walauwa
 Kumbaldiwela Walauwa
 Leuke Walauwa
 Madana Walauwa
 Mahanthegama Walauwa
 Makadawara Meddewatte Walauwa
 Molligoda Walauwa
 Nawa Uhangoda Walauwa
 Polgasdeniya Walauwa
 Rankothdiwela Walauwa
 Udaththavan Walauwa
 Valimanne Walauwa
 Walgama Walauwa
 Athurupane Walauwa Meepitiya Kegalle

Sath Korale Walauwas (Kurunegala District)

   Bogollagama Walauwa
   Katupitiya Walauwa 
   Gopallawa Walauwa
   Dangolle Walauwa, Boyagane
   Palipana Walauwa
   Balalla Walauwa
   Moragollagama Walauwa
   Rekawa Walauwa 
   Ralapanawa Walauwa
   Moonemalle Walauwa
   Sirigala Walauwa
   Galabada Walauwa
   Dodamkumbura Walauwa
   Singhagiriya Walawa
   Welagedara Walauwa
   Weththewé Walauwa
   Gajamadaara Walauwa
   Peragasela Koralé Walauwa
   Galwarama Walauwa
   Mahagedara Walauwa
   Ihala Walauwa (boyawalana)
   Wele Walauwa (boyawalana)
   Boyawalana Walauwa
   Monnekulamé Walauwa
   Kalalpitiyé Walauwa
   Galgomuwé Walauwa
   Madhurawé Walauwa
   Rathmale Walauwa
   Wewelwala Walauwa
   Godawita Walauwa
   Hunukumbure Walauwa
   Udugama Walauwa
   Athapaththuwe Walauwa
   Gajamadaara Walauwa
   Wedande Walauwa, Demataluwa

Prominent Low-Country Walauwas

There have been a number of other prominent, well known walauwas in the southern areas of Ceylon, outside the Kandyan Kingdom. These walauwas comprised a mix of Sri Lankan, Portuguese, Dutch and English architecture.

 Amarasuriya Walauwa, Unawatuna 
 Atapattu Walawwa, Galle
 Bagatale Walauwa, Colombo 3
 Bethme Walawwa, Wehalla
 Boralugoda Walawwa
 Bothale Walawwa, Mirigama
 Chevaliar Walauwa, Moratuwa  
 Closenberg Walauwa, Galle 
 Gandhara Walauwa 
 Horagolla Walauwa, Atthanagalla
 Ihala Walauwa, Kotte
 Jayasinghe Waluwa, Ekala
 Kataluwa Atadahewatte,  Obeyesekere Maha Walawwa
 Kalutara Maha Walauwa
 Kandawala Waluwa, Ratmalana
 Kotalawala Walawwa
 Maha Kappina Walauwa, Balapitiya
 Mahawelatenne Walauwa, Balangoda
 Mandiyagoda Rathnasinghe Walauwa, Beliatta
 Moratuwa Walauwa 
Matara Maha Walauwa
Nakulugamuwa Walawwa, Beliatta
 Obeyesekere Walawa, Colombo 7
 Pahala Walauwa, Barrack Street, Hambantota
Pattikara wasala walauwa, wadduwa
Punchi Kachcheriya walauwa, Pothupitiya 
 Ratnagiri Walawwa, Boralesgamuwa
 Regina Walauwa, Colombo 7
Susew Walauwa Molligoda 
 Udaha Walauwa, Galkissa
 Uda Waluwa, Barrack Street, Hambantota
 Wasala Walauwa, Panadura
 Wasala Walauwa, Terrace Street, Hambantota
Wickramasuriya Walauwa, Kathaluwa

Decline and current states
The word "Walauwa" may not have a Sinhalese origin, it is unclear whether it was a Sinhalese word from the beginning, but this word may have been adapted from the Tamil word "Walaw". In Sinhalese, it gives a plural sound rather than the singular word "Walaw" which means "Mansion". The typical Sinhala term is 'Maha Gedhara'. The English word of "Walauwa" is, "Manor" or "Manor-House",and it's a large house with lands. The Walauwas and its owners were supported by the larger lands and estates they possessed. These were either land grants from Kings (since the beginning of the Sinhalese Kingdom until the Kandyan era) or government service (during the Colonial era) or acquired by successful enterprise and passed down though generations. Their owners were the landed elites of Ceylon, as such they gained a status of power and wealth. A notable feature of many of these walauwas, especially Kandyan walauwas was an interior open space/garden known as the 'medamidula'. There is another theory about Walauwas. "Walavum" means a place where a judgement is given. Those people who occupied the Walauwas had the authority to pass judgement over people with the authority provided by a Royal decree either Sinhala or English. The older walauwas were neither tiled (roof), very large or highly ornate as the king had placed certain restrictions and laws. Many of the walauwas beyond the jurisdiction of the king or after the fall of the Kandyan kingdom sprang up to be large and ornate, displaying architectural influences from beyond Sri Lanka and south India. Mansions replaced the walauwas in the urban areas towards the latter part of the nineteenth century. Though they were referred to as walauwas by the public, the owners usually referred to them with modern names. There are many large mansions of more recent origin which are not walauwas both in the Kandyan and the Low Country areas. This however has changed in the years after independence with the rise of a powerful middle class based on profession and enterprise. The elites held much power within the political cycles. The most significant change occurred in the 1970s with the socialist style land reforms that were bought into place. This limited private land ownership to fifty acres, and private home ownership to two houses. Most families sold off their lands or had them taken over by the government. They retained their Walauwas, yet over the years found it hard to maintain them, resulting in many falling into a dilapidated state, while some were razed to the ground such as the Maha Kappina Walauwa, and Ragama Walauwa which were constructed in the 16th century. Some were bought for state use or others have now been converted into hotels and Shopping complex such as the Ratwatte Walauwa, Rajamanthri Walauwa and the Nugawela Walauwa.

See also
Native headmen of Ceylon
Colonial era mansions of Colombo
Kastane
Sinhalese people

References

1.	^ Seneviratna, Anuradha; Polk, Benjiman (1992). Buddhist Monastic Architecture in Sri Lanka: The Woodland Shrine. Abhinav Publications. p. 110. .

Further reading
 Sri Lanka Walauwa Directory by Dr Mirando Obeysekara (Samanthi Book Publishers) 
 Sinhalese social organization : The Kandyan Period by Ralph Pieris (Ceylon University Press 1956) 
 An Historical Relation of the Island Ceylon in the East Indies by Robert Knox; https://www.gutenberg.org/ebooks/14346

External links
All about Walavvas
 

Kingdom of Kandy
Houses in Sri Lanka
Manor houses in Sri Lanka